Roger Moe (born June 2, 1944) is an American politician who served as a member and majority leader of the Minnesota Senate. He was the Democratic nominee for governor in the 2002 Minnesota gubernatorial election.

Early life and education
Born in Crookston, Moe graduated from Crookston Central High School and received his college degree from Mayville State College in North Dakota. His graduate studies were completed at Moorhead State University and North Dakota State University in Fargo. In 2005, he received an Honorary LL.D from the University of Minnesota.

Career 
Before running for office, he taught math and coached wrestling at Ada High School in Ada, Minnesota.

Politics 
Moe was elected to the Senate in 1970, and was the second-youngest senator in state history at the time. He represented the old District 66 during the 1971–72 biennium and, after the 1972 legislative redistricting, District 2 for the remainder of his time in office. Through the years, he represented all or parts of Becker, Beltrami, Clay, Clearwater, Mahnomen, Norman, Polk and Red Lake counties in the northwestern part of the state.

Moe became the Senate's majority leader in 1981, a position he held for 22 years. He is the longest-serving state majority leader, and the longest-serving leader of either of Minnesota's legislative bodies. His brother, Donald Moe, was also a member of the legislature, serving in both the House and Senate.

Moe sponsored an initiative to transfer lottery proceeds to Minnesota environmental projects (Legislative Commission on Minnesota Resources – LCMR), the creation of the Minnesota State Colleges and Universities governance system, the Midwestern Higher Education Compact, and the Environmental Trust Fund.

After running for lieutenant governor with Skip Humphrey in the 1998 Minnesota gubernatorial election, Moe ran for governor against Tim Pawlenty, Tim Penny and Ken Pentel in 2002. Pawlenty won that election. Moe and his running mate, Julie Sabo, received 36% of the vote in the general election to Pawlenty's 44%.

Later career
Moe has retired from public office. He is a business consultant and lobbyist, and serves on several state and national nonprofit boards, and on the Minnesota Job Skills Partnership Board.

Electoral history
2002 Race for Governor
Tim Pawlenty (R), 44%
Roger Moe (DFL), 36%
Tim Penny (IPM), 16%
Ken Pentel (Grn), 2%

References

External links

Minnesota Public Radio Profile: Roger Moe
Roger Deane Moe papers are available for research use at the Minnesota Historical Society.
Minnesota State Colleges and Universities Foundation Profile: Roger Moe

|-

|-

|-

1944 births
Living people
American Lutherans
Democratic Party Minnesota state senators
Minnesota State University Moorhead alumni
People from Crookston, Minnesota
North Dakota State University alumni
Businesspeople from Minnesota
Schoolteachers from Minnesota
21st-century American politicians